Champaign County is the name of two counties in the United States:

 Champaign County, Illinois 
 Champaign County, Ohio